Nationalist parties in Europe have been on the rise since the early 2010s due to, according to some, austerity measures and immigration.

Linguist Ruth Wodak has stated that the populist parties rising across Europe do so for different reasons in different countries.  In an article published in March 2014, she divided these political parties into four groups:  "parties [which] gain support via an ambivalent relationship with fascist and Nazi pasts" (in, e.g., Austria, Hungary, Italy, Romania, and France), parties which "focus primarily on a perceived threat from Islam" (in, e.g., the Netherlands, Denmark, Poland, Sweden, and Switzerland), parties which "restrict their propaganda to a perceived threat to their national identities from ethnic minorities" (in, e.g., Hungary, Greece, Italy, and the United Kingdom), and parties which "endorse a fundamentalist Christian conservative-reactionary agenda" (in, e.g., Poland, Romania, and Bulgaria).  According to The Economist, the main attraction of far-right parties in the Scandinavian countries is the perception that their national culture is under threat.

Overview
Different parts of Europe have nationalist parties with various ideologies and goals.  Most nationalist parties in Central and Western Europe are described as "right-wing populists". According to Thomas Klau of the European Council on Foreign Relations "as antisemitism was a unifying factor for far-right parties in the 1910s, 20s and 30s, Islamophobia has become the unifying factor in the early decades of the 21st century." Many are Left Wing or Civic Nationalist Parties, which often advocate regionalism.

Nationalist parties are the ruling party in the Republic of Macedonia the VMRO-DPMNE is one of the two major parties in the country. Switzerland is also ruled by a nationalist party by the Swiss People's Party.

In all other countries, nationalist parties are in opposition. In some countries, nationalist parties are major players in politics, such as France's National Rally, Finland's True Finns, Estonia's Conservative People's Party, Italy's Lega Nord, Austria's Freedom Party of Austria Hungary's Jobbik, Turkey's MHP, Greece's Golden Dawn, Armenia's Armenian Revolutionary Federation, the United Kingdom's UK Independence Party, Poland's Law and Justice, Slovakia's Slovak National Party, Denmark's Danish People's Party etc.

Most, if not all, nationalist parties represented in the European Parliament are in the Europe of Freedom and Democracy group.

Eastern Europe and the Caucasus 
Nationalist parties in the Eastern European states differ from the ones in Western Europe mostly by the fact that there is virtually no immigration into these countries.

Governments in Belarus and Azerbaijan are often considered totalitarian and elections in these countries have been described unfair and not free and thus the parliaments are effectively controlled by the ruling party.

Recent developments

Slovenian Parliamentary Elections, 3 June 2018 
Slovenia held its Parliamentary Elections to the National Assembly of Slovenia on 3 June 2018, where 90 members were elected. The Slovenian National Party and Slovenian Democratic Party are the country's two nationalist, far-rightist parties and both gained seats under this election. The Slovenian Democratic Party is the largest party by seats in the National Assembly with 25, while the Slovenian National Party is the smallest party with 4. Thus 29 seats are held by nationalist parties, up 8 seats from the last elections in 2014. A new Government has yet to be formed, though in any case there will be a strong nationalist sentiment in the Assembly.

However in the 2022 Parliamentary elections, the (SNS - Slovene national party and SDS - Slovene democratic party) lost greatly and were replaced by Gibanje svoboda (Freedom movement - center left), Slovenska demokratska stranka (an off-shot of the former non extremist SDS centrists) and Levica (The left - left).

Estonian General election,  March 2019
The Conservative People's Party of Estonia is an Estonian far-right political party, founded in 2012. During the 2019 Estonian parliamentary election it had the largest gain overall of all parties, increasing their seat count by 12 to a total of 19 seats. Its public support is on the rise, according to opinion polls.

Spanish General election,  November 2019
Vox is a Spanish right-wing to far-right political party, founded in 2012. It obtained, by surprise, 24 seats in the Spanish parliament in the April 2019 election. In the November 2019 election Vox obtained 52 seats (an increase) from what it got in early 2019. The president of Vox is Santiago Abascal and its general secretary is Javier Ortega Smith. Its public support is on the rise, according to results of subsequent regional elections, and opinion polls.

Hungarian Parliamentary Elections, 3 April 2022 
Hungary held its General Parliamentary Elections on 3 April 2022, where 199 seats in the National Assembly of Hungary were filled. Two nationalist parties, emerged with seats in the new Assembly, with the new Prime Minister, Viktor Orban, being from the Fidesz-Christian Democratic People's Party. His party gained 135 seats, while the Our Homeland Movement gained 7 seats. This put 142 out of 199 seats in the Hungarian National Assembly under the control of nationalist parties..

Swedish General Elections, 11 September 2022
Sweden held its 2022 Swedish general election on 11 September 2022, where 349 seats in the Riksdag were filled. Sweden Democrats Sweden's far-right political party made gains winning 73 seats and becoming the 2nd largest party in Sweden.

Italian General Elections, 25 September 2022
Italy held its General Elections on 25 September 2022, where 400 Deputies were elected to the Lower House and 200 Senators to the Upper House of the Italian Parliament. Italy's largest far-right party, the Lega Nord or "League" secured 125 seats in the Chamber of Deputies (Lower House) and 58 seats in the Senate (Upper House). The Brothers of Italy, another nationalist party, gained 32 seats in the Chamber of Deputies and 18 seats in the Senate.

Observers commented that the results shifted the geopolitics of the European Union, following far-right gains in France, Spain, and Sweden. It was also noted that the election outcome would mark Italy's first far-right-led government and the country's most right-wing government since 1945.

List

National

Disputed

Regional

European Nationalist political party
 Alliance for Peace and Freedom (2014–present)
 European National Front (2004–2009)

References

Sources

Further reading

External links
Antonis Klapsis, An Unholy Alliance: The European Far Right and Putin's Russia (Brussels: Wilfried Martens Centre for European Studies, 2015) (http://www.martenscentre.eu/publications/far-right-political-parties-in-europe-and-putins-russia, https://www.academia.edu/12673001/An_Unholy_Alliance._The_European_Far_Right_and_Putins_Russia).

 
Nationalist parties in Europe
Nationalist parties